The Anzac Bridge is an eight-lane cable-stayed bridge that carries the Western Distributor (A4) across Johnstons Bay between Pyrmont and Glebe Island (part of the suburb of Rozelle), on the western fringe of the central business district of Sydney, New South Wales, Australia. The bridge forms part of the road network leading from the central business district, the Sydney Harbour Bridge, and Cross City Tunnel to the Inner West and Northern Suburbs.

History

Glebe Island Bridges 
There were two bridges over Johnstons Bay before the construction of the Anzac Bridge.

The first bridge was constructed as part of a project to move the abattoirs out of central Sydney, and to construct public abattoirs at Glebe Island. The first pile of the original bridge was driven in October 1860. It replaced a double steam punt crossing.

The second Glebe Island Bridge was an electrically operated swing bridge opened in 1903, the year after the opening of the new Pyrmont Bridge over Sydney's Darling Harbour, which has a similar design.  The bridge was designed by Percy Allan of the New South Wales Public Works Department who also designed the Pyrmont Bridge. Delays due to increasing traffic, which were exacerbated by having to close a major arterial road to allow the movement of shipping into Blackwattle Bay, led to the construction of the present-day Anzac Bridge. The 1903 bridge is still standing, but there is no access to pedestrians or vehicular traffic.

Anzac Bridge 
The stay cable design concept development and final design for the new bridge were carried out by a team from the NSW Roads & Traffic Authority, led by their Chief Bridge Engineer Ray Wedgwood and the construction by Baulderstone. The bridge was opened to traffic on 3 December 1995 as the Glebe Island Bridge.

The bridge was given its current name on Remembrance Day in 1998 to honour the memory of the soldiers of the Australian and New Zealand Army Corps (known as Anzacs) who served in World War I. An Australian Flag flies atop the eastern pylon and a New Zealand Flag flies atop the western pylon. A bronze memorial statue of an Australian Anzac soldier ("digger") holding a Lee–Enfield rifle in the "rest on arms reverse" drill position was placed on the western end of the bridge on Anzac Day in 2000. A statue of a New Zealand soldier was added to a plinth across the road from the Australian Digger, facing towards the east, and was unveiled by Prime Minister of New Zealand Helen Clark in the presence of Premier of New South Wales Morris Iemma on Sunday 27 April 2008.

Description 
Initially the stay cables were plagued by vibrations which have since been resolved by the addition of thin stabilising cables between the stay cables.

There is a grade-separated shared pedestrian footpath and cycleway located on the northern side of the bridge, making possible a walk from Glebe Point Road, down Bridge Road, over the bridge and round Blackwattle Bay back to Glebe Point Road.

The bridge can carry a maximum of 180,000 cars per day. It reached its maximum capacity in 2002, only seven years after it was finished.

The bridge is regularly patrolled by security guards as a counter-terrorism measure. Security cameras also monitor the walkway.

Also prior to that date, the bridge had seven traffic lanes (4 eastbound, 3 westbound).

Originally, there were bus stops at the western end of the bridge, but they were removed because buses pulling out from the stops created a hazard as they merged with other traffic moving at (or close to) the speed limit. The Australian Anzac statue on the northern side of the bridge is adjacent to the former city-bound bus stop; the New Zealand Anzac statue was installed within the ramp area of the former stop on the southern side.

Use in popular culture
The bridge has been used in a number of artistic works including:

 The bridge was used in the Looking for Alibrandi (1999) movie scene where the title character, Josephine Alibrandi, and her date Jacob Coote rode across the bridge on Jacob's motorcycle.
 Deni Hines' song "It's Alright" (1995) features the nearly completed bridge in the music video group dance sequences, the filming of which taking place a few months before the bridge's December 1995 opening.
 You Am I's song "Purple Sneakers" from the band's album Hi Fi Way (1995) opens with the lyric "Had a scratch only you could itch, underneath the Glebe Point bridge". The Glebe Island Bridge was still under construction when Tim Rogers wrote and recorded the song in 1994, with the bridge's name change to 'Anzac Bridge' not occurring until 1998.

Gallery

See also

 List of bridges in Sydney
 List of longest cable stayed bridges

References

External links

Description and history (with construction photos) of the Anzac Bridge, Sydney
Road Traffic Authority Webcam
  [CC-By-SA]

Bridges completed in 1862
Bridges completed in 1903
Bridges completed in 1995
Bridges in Sydney
Cable-stayed bridges in Australia
Road bridges in New South Wales
1995 establishments in Australia
ANZAC (Australia)
1862 establishments in Australia
Rozelle, New South Wales
Pyrmont, New South Wales